Ramón Montalvo Hernández (born 29 July 1974) is a Mexican politician affiliated with the PRD. From September 1, 2012, to August 31, 2015, he served as Deputy of the LXII Legislature of the Mexican Congress representing the State of Mexico. He also served as the Municipal President (Mayor) of Valle de Chalco from 2006 to 2009 and again from 2016 to 2019.

References

1974 births
Living people
Politicians from the State of Mexico
Municipal presidents in the State of Mexico
Party of the Democratic Revolution politicians
21st-century Mexican politicians
Deputies of the LXII Legislature of Mexico
Members of the Chamber of Deputies (Mexico) for the State of Mexico